was a village located in Hiraka District, Akita Prefecture, Japan.

In 2003, the village had an estimated population of 5,635 and a density of 215.24 persons per km². The total area was 26.18 km².

On October 1, 2005, Taiyū, along with the towns of Hiraka, Jūmonji, Masuda, Omonogawa, Ōmori and the village of Sannai (all from Hiraka District), was merged into the expanded city of Yokote.

References

External links
 Yokote official website 

Dissolved municipalities of Akita Prefecture
Yokote, Akita